Caroline Esmeralda van der Leeuw (born 26 April 1981), known for the project Caro Emerald, is a Dutch pop and jazz singer who mainly performs in English. Active since 2007, she rose to prominence in 2009 with the debut single, "Back It Up". The follow-up single, "A Night Like This", topped charts in the Netherlands.

The debut Caro Emerald album, Deleted Scenes from the Cutting Room Floor, was released on 29 January 2010. By August 2010, the album had spent its 30th week at number one in the Dutch album charts, setting an all-time record and beating Michael Jackson's Thriller by one week. Deleted Scenes from the Cutting Room Floor became the biggest selling album of 2010 in the Netherlands with over 350,000 copies to date. Worldwide, approximately 2 million copies have been sold to date. On 3 October 2010, Emerald was awarded the Dutch music prize Edison Award for Best Female Artist. In 2013, she released a second studio album titled The Shocking Miss Emerald. The album entered at number one in the Dutch and United Kingdom album charts and sold over 600,000 copies.

Early and personal life
Caroline Esmeralda van der Leeuw was born on 26 April 1981, in Amsterdam, the Netherlands to a Dutch father and an Aruban mother. She started singing lessons at age 12 with James Gilloffo in Amsterdam and joined a girl vocal group, Les Elles, under his guidance. Following high school, she trained as a jazz vocalist at the Amsterdam Conservatory, graduating in 2005.

In March 2014 Emerald gave birth to a girl. then gave birth to a second daughter in August 2017.

Career

2007–2008: Career beginnings 
In early 2007, Dutch producer Jan van Wieringen invited van der Leeuw to sing the vocal on a track he was producing with producer/songwriter David Schreurs. The song, "Back It Up", had been written by Schreurs and Canadian songwriter Vince Degiorgio and was based around a hip-hop beat created by Robin Veldman and Jan van Wieringen. Van der Leeuw's jazzy vocal was considered a "perfect match" for the new song.

The demo was pitched to various publishers and labels but without result. The demo then reached public notice around the world online and radio stations started playing the song.

Degiorgio, Schreurs, van Wieringen and van der Leeuw realised their sound had potential and started working on a conceptual studio album with van der Leeuw as "starring artist". Writing began in the summer of 2008 using the mix of "Back It Up", 1940s to 1950s jazz, easy listening, orchestral Latin, combined with infectious beats as a model. Adopting a sample based approach but with live instrumentation, the writing sessions drew from a wide range of influences including jazz organist Jackie Davis, exotica composer Martin Denny, mambo king Perez Prado, 1920s to 1930s jazz, and van der Leeuw's own vocal inspirations of The Andrews Sisters, Billie Holiday and Sarah Vaughan. Their usual method would be for Schreurs to create the ideas and backing tracks, and then get together with top line writer and lyricist Degiorgio to write the songs. Van der Leeuw co-wrote several songs on the album, and van Wieringen co-created the tracks for "The Other Woman" and "Dr Wanna Do". Schreurs and Degiorgio are credited as "Creative Directors".

2009–2012: Deleted Scenes from the Cutting Room Floor

After record labels either refused or failed to sign the project, Schreurs set up their own label, Grandmono. "Back It Up" was released as debut single on 6 July 2009. The song gained airplay and popularity overnight and listed in the Dutch Top 40 for 12 weeks, peaking at No. 12. It became the most played song on 3FM in 2009.

Emerald's debut album, Deleted Scenes from the Cutting Room Floor, was released on 28 January 2010 in The Netherlands by Grandmono. It entered at #1 in the Album Charts and stayed there for weeks. By August 2010, the album had been #1 for 27 weeks, beating Michael Jackson's chart record for Thriller (26 weeks #1 in 1983). The album returned to #1, spending a total of 30 non-consecutive weeks on top spot of the Dutch Albums Chart.

The album reached double platinum (>100,000 copies) status in the Netherlands on 5 July 2010. It reached triple platinum in August 2010, four times platinum (200,000) in November 2010, and sextuple platinum (>300,000 copies) in December 2011. Deleted Scenes from the Cutting Room Floor was removed from the Dutch charts after 104 weeks due to a rule providing albums can't spend >2 years on the charts. Upon re-entry, the album climbed back to #8.

The album's second single, "A Night Like This", was released in December 2009. It was listed in the Dutch Charts for 26 weeks peaking at #1 in January 2010. It was the most played song in The Netherlands in 2010.

In 2011, Deleted Scenes from the Cutting Room Floor was released throughout Europe with great commercial success. It became a hit in the UK (1× platinum with sales exceeding 360,000, 8 weeks top 10 peaking at No. 4), Germany (1× platinum with sales exceeding 280,000, peaking at No. 5 and Platinum single for "A Night Like This" with sales exceeding 340,000), Poland (6× platinum with sales exceeding 60,000), Italy (Gold Single for "Back it Up"), and Austria (No. 1 with "A Night Like This"). In the UK, all six singles and the entire album were A-listed by BBC Radio 2. Over 1,400,000 albums have been sold in Europe.

The cinematic sound of the project resulted in frequent use in TV series, movies and advertising. Selected credits include The Playboy Club, a brand campaign by Martini, 2 Days in New York, The Secret Circle, Wind Mobile, Strictly Come Dancing, Dancing with the Stars, The Vampire Diaries, Agent Carter, Nestlé, Ferrero Rocher, Wrigley and Disney Nature film Chimpanzee.

Due to its exceptional success, the album was included in an episode of the Dutch version of Classic Albums in April 2012.

On New Year's Eve 2011, Caro appeared on Jools Holland's Hootenanny.

In January 2011, Emerald won the Popprijs 2010 for Best Dutch Pop Act of 2010. In early 2012, Emerald won a Goldene Kamera for Best Musik International and an Echo Award for Best Newcomer International.

2013–2014: The Shocking Miss Emerald
In April 2013, the second Caro Emerald studio album The Shocking Miss Emerald was released. It included the singles "Tangled Up" and "Liquid Lunch". The album went to #1 in the UK album chart. She performed in the UK at The BBC Radio Theatre; it was broadcast on BBC Radio 2 and BBC Red Button.

On 29 June 2014, she played the opening music set on the pyramid stage at the Glastonbury Festival 2014.

2015–2020: Emerald Island

In April 2015, Emerald released a single, "Quicksand".

In March 2017, Emerald released an exotica inspired EP, Emerald Island. It was released to accompany the Emerald Island Tour.

In June 2020, Emerald released "Wake Up Romeo," her first single in three years.

2022-present: The Jordan 

On 23 August 2022, Caro was revealed as the voice behind new act The Jordan. Her debut album, ‘Nowhere Near The Sky’, was released on February 10, 2023 via Cooking Vinyl.  The first three singles from the album are ’You Don’t Even Know Me’, ’Dancing Naked in the Sun’, and ’The Room’.

Awards 
 11 April 2010: 3FM Serious Talent Award
 15 April 2010: 
 26 April 2010: De Eerste Prijs
 3 October 2010: Edison Award, Best Female Singer
 MTV Europe Music Award, Best Dutch and Belgian Act
 12 January 2011: European Border Breakers Award 2011
 15 January 2011: 3FM Mega Award 2010
 15 January 2011: Popprijs 2010
 3 March 2011: Zilveren Harp 2010
 3 March 2011: Het Beste Nederlandse lied 2010 (Best Song of the Year 2010)
 14 March 2011: NPO 3FM, Best Album and Best Female Singer
 12 June 2011: TMF Award for Best Female Singer
 4 February 2012: Goldene Kamera 2012, Best Music International
 March 2012: Echo Music Prize, Best International Newcomer

Discography

Studio albums

Live albums

Extended plays

Singles

References

External links 

 
 Official Uvumi Profile
 Caro Emerald Profile and Discography on This is Vintage Now
 

1981 births
21st-century Dutch singers
Conservatorium van Amsterdam alumni
Dutch jazz singers
Dutch pop singers
Dutch people of Aruban descent
Electro swing musicians
English-language singers from the Netherlands
Living people
Musicians from Amsterdam
21st-century Dutch women singers
MTV Europe Music Award winners